The 2006 GP Miguel Induráin was the 53rd edition of the GP Miguel Induráin cycle race and was held on 1 April 2006. The race was won by Fabian Wegmann.

General classification

References

2006
2006 in Spanish road cycling